Heinrich Klüver (May 25, 1897 – February 8, 1979) was a German-American biological psychologist and
philosopher born in Holstein.

After having served in the Imperial German Army during World War I, he studied at both the University of Hamburg and the University of Berlin from 1920-23. In the latter year, he arrived in the United States to attend Stanford University. He received his Ph.D. in physiological psychology from Stanford University. In 1927 he married Cessa Feyerabend and settled in the United States permanently, becoming a naturalized U.S. citizen in 1934. Klüver was a member of the 'core group' of cybernetics pioneers that participated in the Macy Conferences of the 1940s and 1950s. He collaborated most often and fruitfully with Paul Bucy and made various contributions to neuroanatomy throughout his career among others the Klüver–Bucy syndrome.

His expositions of and experiments with mescaline were also groundbreaking at the time. He coined the term "cobweb figure" in the 1920s to describe one of the four form constant geometric visual hallucinations experienced in the early stage of a mescaline trip: "Colored threads running together in a revolving center, the whole similar to a cobweb". The other three are the chessboard design, tunnel, and spiral. Klüver wrote that "many 'atypical' visions are upon close inspection nothing but variations of these form-constants."

Klüver was an elected member of the American Academy of Arts and Sciences, the United States National Academy of Sciences, and the American Philosophical Society.

Selected publications

 An Experimental Study of the Eidetic Type. Worcester, Mass.: Genetic Psychology Monographs, vol. 1, no. 2 (1926); New York: Arno Press (1975).
 Mescal: The 'Divine' Plant and it’s Psychological Effects. London: Kegan Paul, Trench, Trubner & Co. (1928). Introduction by Macdonald Critchley.
 Mechanism of Hallucinations In: Studies in Personality, by Q. McNemar and M. A. Merrill (1942).
 Behavior Mechanisms in Monkeys. Chicago: Phoenix Books (1966). Introduction by Karl Spencer Lashley.
 Mescal, and Mechanism of Hallucinations. Chicago: Phoenix Books (1966).

See also
 Klüver–Bucy syndrome
 Form constant

References

Sources

 Hunt, William A. (Mar. 1980). "Heinrich Klüver: 1897-1979" (obituary). American Journal of Psychology, vol. 93, no. 1, pp. 159-161. .
 Nahm, Frederick K. D., and Karl H. Pribram (1998). "Heinrich Klüver" (Chapter 16). In: National Academy of Sciences (1998). Biographical Memoirs: Volume 73. Washington, D.C.: National Academies Press. pp. 288-305. .
An in-depth biography of Heinrich Klüver.

External links
 Guide to the Heinrich Klüver Papers, 1912-1978 at the University of Chicago Library

1897 births
1979 deaths
People from the Province of Schleswig-Holstein
University of Hamburg alumni
Humboldt University of Berlin alumni
Stanford University alumni
German emigrants to the United States
German Army  personnel of World War I
German psychologists
Naturalized citizens of the United States
20th-century psychologists
Members of the American Philosophical Society